Klever is a village in the municipality of Sande, Norway. Its population (SSB 2005) is 371 and  has an area of 0.4 km ².

The local sports club is Nordre Sande IL.

Villages in Vestfold og Telemark